Arafa Muslim Maha Vidyalaya, commonly called Arafa MMV,  (1966 - 2020 ) is a coeducational school in Udunuwara, under the administration of the Central Province, Sri Lanka in the Kandy District .  The school has the classes from grade 1 to grade 13 Tamil medium. The first principal was Noor Mohammed Kalugamuwa Gelioya. In the 2019 General Examination of Advance Level exam, 15 students sat the examination and 13 got admission to the university one remarkable university admission was entry to the faculty of law

History 
From 1960, a request was made to the education department to start a primary school by the community leaders led by then school teacher H. L. A. Majeed but it was approved after the local member of parliament D. B. Wijethunge. As customary those days the schools started with religious institution accordingly this school was also started at Wahunkoha Jummah Mosque building with the 25 students the first principal was Noor Mohammed of Kalugamuwa Gelioya he had to conduct the school along for one month until another three teachers were assigned to the school. In September 1966 another 82 students who were studying nearby Alamanar Mahavidyalaya (presently a national school) the inaugural ceremony of the school took place in 1974 under the patronage of then member of parliament D. B. Wijethunge, the zonal educational officers and many of the public participated.

On 15 August 1968 A. M. Riyal of Kalugamuwa was appointed as new principal when it was foreseen to start grade 6 in year 1970 it was found that inadequate place an obstacle to start grade 6 hence the school administration-and parents deep concern was to find a land to elaborate the schools building this ended up in acquiring land called bulugahapitiya watts belonging to a Famous philanthropist Alan Nugawela of Eladatta Walawwa. In 1971 Sulaiman Lebbe of Buwelikada came into the position of principal and a request was made through then village council member H. L. M. Rasheed to then parliamentarian T. B. Jayasundera allocated Rs 50000/ then the commencement of the building work took place in 1972 and finally the school moved to the present place where it is now the inaugural ceremony of the new schools building was conducted under the leadership of Neal de Alvis the Minister of state along with then member of parliament T. B. Jayasundara

In 1977 the 2nd building was proposed by D. B. Wijetunge then mp for udunuwara in 1979 H. L. A. Majeed was appointed as the new principal and in 1979.04.29 the inaugural ceremony of the 2nd building took place and the electricity and water supply was obtained, at the same time year exhibition was held and houses were divided and conducted the sports meet In 1982.01.10 the houses were Hira Safa and Mina when the principals Mr majeed got his retirement Mr HMLM Samoon who was working as a teacher took over the as principal of the school when the population of the students were repeatedly increasing there were lack of space again so they took measures to obtain another building as a result they received the 3rd building the inaugural ceremony of the 3rd building took place on 1982.03.13 Wijetunge who was the minister of postal and telecommunications affairs and participated as the chief guest opened the building

Another important incident took place in 1984 it in this year that the students of the schools sat for the ordinary level examinations for the first time 5 students sat for the examination among them four were qualified for the advance level it is on the 18th year of the schools that this incident took place. With this GCE OL examination results of the students population were increasing rapidly in the meantime H. M. L. M. Samoon who was the principal at that time was transferred to another school in 1994 and his successor was J. M. Nizam Welamboda Udunuwara the opening ceremony of the building construction by Hon premadasa through the recommendation of the youth commission formed by him led by professor G L Peries the building consists of a main hall library science lab home science room and the life skill section.

The opening ceremony was conducted by the Wijethunge many shortcomings were fulfilled throughout this building in 1997.01.31 J. M. Nijam was transferred and his successor was S. N. Nizardeen of Galle who was then a resident of Hendeniya. 
In 1999.02.12 the name of this school was officially changed to as Arafa Muslim Vidyalaya then the principal Nizardeen retired in 2003.06.06 and N. P. M. Awoon from Muruthagahamula was his successor. In 2004 school was granted permission to start advance level and first AL class composed of 07 students and notable thing was female student, Rishama Haris, got best result and entered Peradeniya University and completed BA in Arts. In 2006 .06.03 Awoon retired and his successor was A. C. Faleel from Kalugamuwa in 2006. Mr Faleel principal then transferred to another school in 2009.06.13 and his successor was Mrs faizal Umma finally with the recommendation of then provincial council members S. M. M. Marjan under the nanoda project Sarath Ekanayaka then chief minister of central Province allocated Rs 7million as a result of this 02 storied building was constructed and it was declared open on 09.04.2014 by Sarath Ekanayaka chief minister of the Central Province. On that occasion, the guest of honour was S. M. M. Marjan with this class inadequate classes for students were fulfilled. When mrs faizan Umma was principal G C E O/L exam one student got for the first time in the history of the Schools 02 student got 9A followed by 8A 01B too. In 2009.6.13 Faizan Umma principal retired and her successor was Aisha Bee I briefly and Fazly Sulaiman took over the principals post in 2015 and he returned in 2017. His successor is Sajahan who is the current principal.

Play ground
          

Parents and philanthropist donated money to purchase 200 peaches land to construct a playground in 1997 when the principal Awoon was a principal few loads of soil from the school land and filled the land to make a playground but it was not sufficient to be good playground again in 2015 school development society led by secretary M. I. M. Niyas filled more loads of soil to make the ground playable but the government officers did not approve the filling. The reason given was soil is not in par with quality standatrd so sdc had to bear the cost itself, p. 178 and 179. SLM Fareed, Sri Lanka . </ref>

Smart Room
in 2017 a smart room was planned accordingly old boys and philanthropist helped to prepare a room and installed smart board and projector it's almost 60% completed but teachers are using the facilities to teach students though it has not been fully completed

References

Schools in Kandy District